Antal Rizmayer (born 5 September 1939) is a Hungarian wrestler. He competed at the 1960 Summer Olympics and the 1964 Summer Olympics.

References

External links
 
 
 

1939 births
Living people
Hungarian male sport wrestlers
Olympic wrestlers of Hungary
Wrestlers at the 1960 Summer Olympics
Wrestlers at the 1964 Summer Olympics
Martial artists from Budapest